Octospiniferoides is a genus of worms belonging to the family Neoechinorhynchidae.

The species of this genus are found in Central America.

Species:

Octospiniferoides australis 
Octospiniferoides chandleri 
Octospiniferoides incognita

References

Neoechinorhynchidae
Acanthocephala genera